End of Everything are a Scottish progressive death metal band from Glasgow, Scotland. Their album, Three, was released in 2006 and received a 7/10 from Metal Hammer. They have supported Fear Factory and played at the Taste of Chaos Festival.

References

External links
 Myspace page for the band

British progressive metal musical groups
Scottish death metal musical groups